Greve Strand (commonly also known simply as Greve) is a Danish town, seat of the Greve Municipality, in the Region Sjælland. Its population is 43,573 (1. January 2022).

History
Until the 1960s, the area was primarily agricultural: most businesses in town were concentrated along the coastal road "Strandvejen".

Geography
Greve Strand is located on the eastern side of the Zealand island, not too far (approx. 25km) from Copenhagen and is a part of its urban area.

Notable people 
 Max Jørgensen (1923 in Kildebrønde – 1992) a Danish cyclist, competed in the team pursuit at the 1948 Summer Olympics
 Rune Ohm (born 1980 in Greve) a Danish handball player
 Mie Lacota (born 1988 in Greve) a professional road and track cyclist
 Nadia Offendal (born 1994 in Greve) a Danish handball player
 Andreas Bruus (born 1999 in Greve) a Danish footballer
 Amalie Magelund (born 2000) a Danish badminton player, lives in Greve

See also
Greve station

References

External links

Municipal seats of Region Zealand
Municipal seats of Denmark
Copenhagen metropolitan area
Cities and towns in Region Zealand
Greve Municipality